There have been six baronetcies created for persons with the surname Thomas, three in the Baronetage of England, one in the Baronetage of Great Britain and two in the Baronetage of the United Kingdom. Two of the creations are extant as of 2016.

The Thomas Baronetcy, of Michaelstown in the County of Glamorgan, was created in the Baronetage of England on 3 March 1642 for Edward Thomas. The second Baronet, Robert Thomas, sat as Member of Parliament for Cardiff. The title became extinct on his death in 1685.

The Thomas Baronetcy, of Folkington in the County of Sussex, was created in the Baronetage of England on 23 July 1660 for William Thomas, for many years Member of Parliament for Seaford and Sussex. The title became extinct on his death in 1706.

The Thomas Baronetcy, of Wenvoe in the County of Glamorgan, was created in the Baronetage of England on 24 December 1694 for John Thomas. The third Baronet represented Chippenham and Glamorganshire in the House of Commons. The tenth Baronet was admitted to the Privy Council in 1958.

The Thomas Baronetcy, of Yapton in the County of Sussex, was created in the Baronetage of Great Britain on 6 September 1766 for George Thomas, Governor of the Leeward Islands from 1753 to 1766. The third Baronet sat as Member of Parliament for Arundel. The seventh Baronet was a prominent chess player. The title became extinct on his death in 1972.

The Thomas Baronetcy, of Garreglwyd in the County of Anglesey, was created in the Baronetage of the United Kingdom on 5 July 1918 for Robert Thomas. He was a ship and insurance broker and also represented Wrexham and Anglesey in the House of Commons.

The Thomas Baronetcy, of Ynyshir in the County of Glamorgan, was created in the Baronetage of the United Kingdom on 10 May 1919 for the coalowner and philanthropist James Thomas. He constructed the Welsh National Medical School in Cardiff and also served as high sheriff of Glamorganshire in 1936. His son, the second Baronet, was a deputy lieutenant and High Sheriff for Monmouthshire. As of 2012 the title is held by the latter's son, the third Baronet, who succeeded in 2005.

Thomas baronets, of Llanmihangel (Michaelstown) (1642)
Sir Edward Thomas, 1st Baronet (died 1673)
Sir Robert Thomas, 2nd Baronet (–1685)

Thomas baronets, of Folkington (1660)
Sir William Thomas, 1st Baronet (1641–1706)

Thomas baronets, of Wenvoe (1694)

Sir John Thomas, 1st Baronet (died 1703)
Sir Edmond Thomas, 2nd Baronet (1667–1723)
Sir Edmond Thomas, 3rd Baronet (1712–1767)
Sir Edmond Thomas, 4th Baronet (–1789)
Sir John Thomas, 5th Baronet (1749–1828)
Sir John Godfrey Thomas, 6th Baronet (1784–1841)
Sir Edmond Stephen Thomas, 7th Baronet (1810–1852)
Sir Godfrey John Thomas, 8th Baronet (1824–1861)
Sir Godfrey Vignoles Thomas, 9th Baronet (1856–1919)
Sir Godfrey John Vignoles Thomas, 10th Baronet (1889–1968)
Sir Godfrey Michael David Thomas, 11th Baronet (1925–2003)
Sir David John Godfrey Thomas, 12th Baronet (born 1961)

Thomas baronets, of Yapton (1766)

Sir George Thomas, 1st Baronet (died 1774)
Sir William Thomas, 2nd Baronet (died 1777)
Sir George Thomas, 3rd Baronet (c. 1740–1815)
Sir William Lewis George Thomas, 4th Baronet (1777–1850)
Sir William Sidney Thomas, 5th Baronet (1807–1867)
Sir George Sidney Meade Thomas, 6th Baronet (1847–1918)
Sir George Alan Thomas, 7th Baronet (1881–1972)

Thomas baronets, of Garreglwyd (1918)
Sir Robert John Thomas, 1st Baronet (1873–1951)
Sir William Eustace Rhyddlad Thomas, 2nd Baronet (1909–1957)
Sir (William) Michael Marsh Thomas, 3rd Baronet (1930–2009)

Arms

Thomas baronets, of Ynyshir (1919)
Sir (William) James Thomas, 1st Baronet (1867–1945)
Sir William James Cooper Thomas, 2nd Baronet (1919–2005)
Sir William Michael Thomas, 3rd Baronet (born 1948)

The heir presumptive to the baronetcy is Stephen Francis Thomas (born 1951), 2nd and youngest son of the 2nd Baronet and brother of the current occupant.  His heir apparent is his eldest son, Toby James Thomas (born 1988).

Notes

References
Kidd, Charles, Williamson, David (editors). Debrett's Peerage and Baronetage (1990 edition). New York: St Martin's Press, 1990, 

Baronetcies in the Baronetage of England
Baronetcies in the Baronetage of the United Kingdom
Extinct baronetcies in the Baronetage of England
Extinct baronetcies in the Baronetage of Great Britain
Extinct baronetcies in the Baronetage of the United Kingdom
Baronetcies created with special remainders
1642 establishments in England
1766 establishments in Great Britain
1918 establishments in the United Kingdom